Cobblestone Museum may refer to:

Cobblestones Museum in Greytown, New Zealand
Cobblestone Farm and Museum, in Ann Arbor, Michigan
Cobblestone Society and Museum, in Gaines, New York, in the Cobblestone Historic District
Howland Cobblestone Store, also known as the Howland Stone Store Museum, in Scipio, New York
Tinker Cobblestone Farmstead, also known as the Tinker Homestead Museum, in Henrietta, New York